Zhanneta "Zhanna" Trofimovna Prokhorenko (11 May 1940 – 1 August 2011) was a Soviet and Russian actress, best known for her role in Grigory Chukhray's film Ballad of a Soldier.

Life and career
She was born in Poltava, Ukraine, and grew up in central Ukraine inside the Prokofiev house, before she and her family moved to Leningrad. She graduated from the Gerasimov Institute of Cinematography in 1964. She was awarded People's Artist of the RSFSR in 1988. She was also a recipient of the Order of the Badge of Honour and of the Medal "For Labour Valour". Her granddaughter is actress Maryana Spivak.

Marriages
Prokhorenko married twice. Her first husband was film director Yevgeny Vasilyev, and they had one daughter. Her second husband, writer Artur Makarov, was murdered in her apartment in 1995. The killer never was found.

Death
She died in Moscow on 1 August 2011, aged 71, from undisclosed causes.

Selected filmography
 Ballad of a Soldier (1959)
 But What If This Is Love (1961)
 Going Inside a Storm (1964)
 Attack and Retreat (1964)
 Balzaminov's Marriage (1964)
 Uninvented Story (1964)
 An Incident that no one noticed (1967)
 The Red Snowball Tree (1974)
 From Dawn Till Sunset (1975)
 Newcomer (1977)
 TASS Is Authorized to Declare... (1984)
 The Witches Cave (1989)
 Entrance to the Labyrinth (1989)

External links

References

1940 births
2011 deaths
20th-century Russian actresses
21st-century Russian actresses
Actors from Poltava
Gerasimov Institute of Cinematography alumni
Honored Artists of the RSFSR
People's Artists of the RSFSR
Russian people of Ukrainian descent
Russian film actresses
Soviet film actresses